Kiwi Property Group Limited is a New Zealand NZX-listed company, formerly a real estate investment trust, that owns many properties throughout New Zealand; including the Sylvia Park Business and Shopping Centre, and the Vero Centre. It is also New Zealand's largest-listed property fund.

History

1990s
Kiwi Property was established in 1992 as the Kiwi Income Property Trust as a property trust by Ross Green and Richard Didsbury.

Kiwi Income Property Trust acquired New Zealand Land Limited in 1994; which held a total portfolio of nine properties.

In 1995 Kiwi Income invested $9.75 million into 11.8ha of land in a 'brown zone' area, Mt. Wellington. They further invested another $20 million in 1999 for 9.1ha of land directly adjacent to the north of their existing land.

In 1998 Kiwi Income divested a 50% shareholding in their management company leading to Land Lease investing and becoming a joint-ownership partner of Kiwi Income.

2000s
In 2001, a strategic move lead Kiwi Income to acquire Kiwi Development Trust, the developers and managers of the Royal & Sun Alliance Building which is now known as the Vero Centre.

In 2002, Colonial First State acquired a 100% shareholding in the management company of Kiwi Income, making Kiwi Income a wholly owned subsidiary of Colonial First State.

In 2007 the Sylvia Park Shopping Centre was completed.

2010s
During the 2011 Christchurch earthquake both of Kiwi Income's properties in Christchurch were affected. In the aftermath of the earthquake the Northlands Shopping Centre underwent seismic remediation, and the  PricewaterhouseCoopers Tower was demolished; however a $70 million insurance claim was paid out.

Kiwi Income developed ASB North Wharf, the New Zealand headquarters for ASB Bank, with Fletcher Construction completing the development in 2013.

In 2013 a consortium of investors purchased all Kiwi Income shares from Colonial First State; leading to 5 December 2014 vote of which 99.9% voted in favor of a name change and rebranding as Kiwi Property Group, becoming a New Zealand registered company rather than a trust.

In September 2015, Kiwi announced the purchase of Westgate Lifestyle, a shopping complex located in Westgate for $82.5 million. It was also reported that they entered into a joint-venture with Tainui Group Holdings to own and manage 50% of The Base in Hamilton for $192.5 Million.

In October 2017 a deal was signed by Kiwi Property and Meridian Energy to install hundreds of roof top solar panels to harness renewable energy at four of its shopping malls namely Auckland's LynnMall, Hamilton's The Base, Palmerston North's The Plaza and Christchurch's Northlands.

Listings
Kiwi Income was listed on the New Zealand Exchange in 1993 under the ticker code of KIP.

All Kiwi Property shareholders are required to hold a minimum of 200 shares.

Assets

Shopping Centres

Sylvia Park and Sylvia Park Lifestyle

Sylvia Park and Sylvia Park Lifestyle are collectively a large business park and shopping centre in the Auckland suburb of Mount Wellington, in New Zealand. Less commonly known, the area around the centre (which includes some residential and other commercial developments) is also called Sylvia Park (the centre takes its name from the area, not vice versa, but Sylvia Park is not officially a suburb). The area is located adjacent to two major interchanges of the Auckland Southern Motorway – the South-Eastern Highway (which passes directly through the shopping centre on a viaduct) and Mount Wellington Highway.

Land and store space in the Sylvia Park development is let out to a wide variety of major retailers, with key tenants including The Warehouse Group, Hoyts Cinemas, Whitcoulls bookstore, H&M, Zara (both opened in October 2016) and Kmart (opened in early 2019) as well as the Pak'nSave supermarket. In addition, the centre has franchises of all major New Zealand banks and a wide variety of other retailers. The centre employs approximately 2,500 staff.

In a rating of New Zealand shopping centres by a retail expert group in 2008, Sylvia Park received four stars, the maximum rating, based on the criteria of amount of shopping area, economic performance, amenity and appeal as well as future growth prospects. Especially praised were the wide catchment of shoppers and the motorway accessibility

Kiwi Income purchased the Apex Mega Centre located opposite the existing Sylvia Park Shopping and Business Centre in December 2014 for $64 million. After the purchase, Apex Mega was rebranded as Sylvia Park Lifestyle and was subsequently integrated into the Sylvia Park complex; however it still remains a separate shopping complex.

LynnMall

New Zealand's first shopping centre, LynnMall, has been serving Auckland's western suburbs since opening in 1963. The centre has continued to evolve and is undergoing redevelopment.

LynnMall was acquired by Kiwi Property in early December 2010 from AMP Capital Property for $174 million. The purchase was praised by analysts; including Buffy Gill of Goldman Sachs.

LynnMall underwent a $50 million renovation in 2013. Further expansion commenced in January 2015 at a cost of $39 million.

Centre Place

Centre Place is a shopping centre located in Hamilton. In 2013, the centre was extensively redeveloped, providing a wide mix of high-quality national and international retailers and dining options. The centre is anchored by a Farmers department store and features Lido and METRO by Hoyts cinema complexes. Kiwi Property acquired the asset in three tranches between December 1994 and December 2005.

In 2000, Centre Place underwent a $10 million redevelopment to increase the size of the shopping centre from 65 stores to 85; other additions were a 'mothers room', a 14,000 m2 international food-court, and a new 'Lifestyle Precinct'. Development Manager Nick Sharp said in a statement that "We want to put a lot more emphasis in the entertainment and leisure sectors". The build was managed by local construction firm Hawkins Construction.

In December 2015, Kiwi Property sold the newly redeveloped section of the Centre Place shopping centre. Centre Place South was sold to an unnamed New Zealand buyer for $46.7 million.

The Plaza

The Plaza Shopping Centre is a shopping mall in the central area of Palmerston North, New Zealand owned by Kiwi Property. It is the largest shopping mall in the Manawatu region and is home to many of New Zealand's favourite brands.

Originally 19,700 m2 (212,000 sq ft), the mall underwent redevelopment from 2008 to 2010 refurbishing the existing space and expanding to 32,000 m2 (340,000 sq ft). Redevelopment was done in three stages. The first stage opened in March 2009 with a new food court, a multi-level carpark and 15 new specialty stores. The second stage opened in September 2009 with an additional 10 specialty stores. The third stage opened March 2010 with the addition of 32 specialty stores, a two-storey 7,200 m2 (78,000 sq ft) Farmers department store and another multi-level carpark.

Northlands
Northlands Shopping Centre is a shopping mall in Christchurch, New Zealand. It encompasses five major tenants (Pak'nSave, The Warehouse Group, Countdown, Farmers Trading Company and Hoyts) and 117 specialty stores equating to approximately 41,000 m2 of retail.

In 2003, Northlands shopping centre underwent a $90 million expansion.

Table of details

Office space

Vero Centre

The Vero Centre (constructed as the Royal & SunAlliance Centre) is a high rise office tower located in Auckland, New Zealand. Constructed in 2000, it was Auckland's first major tower built since the 1980s. The centre contains a health club and gymnasium, main entry public foyer, retail outlets in the five podium levels and 32 office levels. As of 2005, it is New Zealand's tallest landmark office tower. It is also known for its 'halo' roof feature.

While atypically tall compared to the surrounding area, its construction is considered to have had a positive effect on the regeneration of the eastern Auckland CBD area. The site had previously been occupied by a number of vacant lots and low-rise buildings, including student accommodation, industrial warehouses and massage parlours.

Table of details

Corporate governance

References

Companies listed on the New Zealand Exchange
Real estate companies of New Zealand